Hernando is a city in, and the county seat of, DeSoto County, which is on the northwestern border of Mississippi, United States. The population was 17,138 according to the 2020 census records. DeSoto County is the second-most-populous county in the Memphis metropolitan area, which includes counties in Tennessee, Arkansas and Mississippi.

U.S. Route 51 and the I-55 freeway traverse the city from north to south, and the I-69 freeway crosses the city from east to west. The county courthouse is located within Hernando's historic downtown square. It is located at the intersection of Commerce Street and present-day U.S. 51.

History
At the time of encounters by French and Spanish colonists, the Chickasaw people had long inhabited this area. France had developed colonial settlements along the Gulf Coast, to the north on the middle Mississippi River in what was called the Illinois Country, and in New France (present-day Quebec in Canada). An 18th-century French colonial log house (see first photo in gallery below) in Hernando is a reminder of typical dwellings built in their settlements in the Illinois country, such as in Ste. Genevieve, Missouri. The French and French Canadians had a wide trading network with various American Indian tribes along this river, for instance in Natchez.

Following the Indian Removal Act in 1830 and under pressure from the United States, the Chickasaw finally signed a treaty to cede most of their lands in this area to the US. Most of the tribe were removed to west of the Mississippi River in Indian Territory.

This town was first called Jefferson by its new European American settlers. It was renamed as Hernando in 1832, after the Spanish explorer Hernando de Soto. He was the first European to explore the Mississippi River. 

During the early 20th century, numerous blues musicians developed in Hernando. African Americans had developed a strong musical tradition in areas along the Mississippi River, where many had grown up in families working as sharecroppers on cotton plantations. During the Great Migration of the first half of the 20th century, many blues musicians migrated north, taking their music to Chicago and helping create the culture of that city.

Geography
Hernando is in the center of DeSoto County, bordered to the north by the city of Southaven. It is  via the same road to the south to Senatobia.

Climate
The climate in this area is characterized by hot, humid summers and generally mild to cool winters.  According to the Köppen Climate Classification system, Hernando has a humid subtropical climate, abbreviated "Cfa" on climate maps.

Demographics

2020 census

As of the 2020 United States Census, there were 17,138 people, 5,770 households, and 4,237 families residing in the city.

2000 census
As of the census of 2000, there were 6,812 people, 2,482 households, and 1,809 families residing in the city. The racial makeup of the city was 76.35% White, 21.48% African American, 0.15% Native American, 0.66% Asian, 0.78% from other races, and 0.59% from two or more races. Hispanic or Latino of any race were 3.04% of the population.

There were 2,482 households, out of which 35.5% had children under the age of 18 living with them, 55.2% were married couples living together, 13.4% had a female householder with no husband present, and 27.1% were non-families. 22.9% of all households were made up of individuals, and 8.5% had someone living alone who was 65 years of age or older. The average household size was 2.60 and the average family size was 3.05.

In the city, the population was spread out, with 25.9% under the age of 18, 9.4% from 18 to 24, 30.9% from 25 to 44, 22.0% from 45 to 64, and 11.7% who were 65 years of age or older. The median age was 34 years. For every 100 females, there were 98.8 males. For every 100 females age 18 and over, there were 97.5 males.

The median income for a household in the city was $43,217, and the median income for a family was $51,155. Males had a median income of $39,706 versus $25,685 for females. The per capita income for the city was $20,731. About 6.5% of families and 9.8% of the population were below the poverty line, including 12.2% of those under age 18 and 16.3% of those age 65 or over.

Education
Hernando is home to 5 public schools and is served by the DeSoto County School District.

Gallery

Media
 DeSoto Times-Tribune

Notable people
 Garfield Akers, blues musician
 DeAundre Alford, cornerback for the Atlanta Falcons
 George "Mojo" Buford, blues musician
 Louis Bullard, former professional football player
 Paul Burlison, musician and member of The Rock and Roll Trio
 Melissa Cookston, chef and 7-time World Barbecue Champion 
 Kevin Dockery, former professional football player
 Nathan Bedford Forrest, Confederate general in Civil War
 Marshall Grant, former bass player for Johnny Cash
 Jim Jackson, blues musician
 James Oliver, first African-American to graduate from UMMC
 Ricky Robertson, track and field high jumper, 2016 Olympian, 10-time NCAA All-American at Ole Miss 
 Deljuan Robinson, former professional football player
 Bradley Sowell,  former professional football player
 Garrison Starr, singer/songwriter
 Frank Stokes, blues musician
 Robert Wilkins, blues musician

References

External links

City of Hernando official website
DeSoto County Museum
DeSoto County Information
Hernando High School official website

 
Cities in DeSoto County, Mississippi
County seats in Mississippi
Cities in the Memphis metropolitan area
Cities in Mississippi